Colonel Green may refer to:

 Colonel Phillip Green, a fictional villain in the Star Trek universe
Edward Howland Robinson Green, also called Colonel Green, American heir, stamp and coin collector
Colonel George Gill Green, an American doctor and Civil War commander